Guilty is a remix single by Gravity Kills, released by TVT Records.

It also includes the album version of the song, and tracks 6 and 7 include both the remix by tomandandy, and the demo version of "Goodbye".

The Juno Reactor remix of the song was featured in the Stanley Cup FMV sequence in NHL '99 and featured in the film, Beowulf.

Noticeably absent from the "Guilty" single is the song's 'Single Remix', which played on radio stations and garnered Gravity Kills brief mainstream popularity in 1996. However, the single version was included on the Se7en soundtrack, which was released before the band's popularity in 1995. Although the song on the soundtrack is in fact, the 'Single Remix' version, it is not denoted as such on the soundtrack packaging.

"Guilty" was heard in the promo for the fifth season of True Blood.

Track listing

Chart positions

References

External links
Gravity Kills "Guilty" Music video link

1996 singles
TVT Records singles
Gravity Kills songs
1996 songs
Song articles with missing songwriters